For Father is the second album by Stephen Simmonds.

Track listing
 Beautiful Day/Nevermind
 Where Is Your Heart
 Let Me Touch 04: For Father
 I Can't Do That
 Always In My Head
 America To Africa
 The Love Is Gone
 I Miss You
 If I Was Your Man
 More To Do

Singles
I Can't Do That
Let Me Touch
For Father

2002 albums
Stephen Simmonds albums